Midwest Steel & Iron Works was a metal fabrication company based in Denver, Colorado. Founded in 1893, the company was known for a time as the Jackson-Richter Iron Works. The company was one of the "oldest and largest metal fabricators" in Denver. The company built both structural and ornamental components for structures throughout Colorado, Wyoming, and New Mexico. The company's headquarters on Larimer Street in Denver includes an Art Deco office building and consists of a four-building complex that is itself considered a historic industrial site. The complex served as the company's headquarters from 1923 to 1983. 
 
Among other works, the company manufactured the four Big Thompson River bridges in Estes Park and Loveland, Colorado, all of which are listed on the National Register of Historic Places.

The Midwest Steel and Iron Works Company Complex at 25 Larimer Street in Denver dates from 1906. It was headquarters of the Midwest Steel and Iron Works.

The office building was built in 1906 and expanded in 1930 and in 1955. The 1930 addition was a two-story Art Deco style brick  by  building designed by Denver architect Roland L. Linder.

The shop building was built in 1911 and expanded in 1923, 1952, and 1967. While most of the firm's early machinery no longer exists, the shop contains an original rivet forge from circa 1925.

The complex was listed on the National Register of Historic Places in 1985.

References

External links

Bridge companies
Historic American Engineering Record in Colorado
National Register of Historic Places in Denver
Art Deco architecture in Colorado
Industrial buildings completed in 1906
Industrial buildings and structures on the National Register of Historic Places in Colorado
Construction and civil engineering companies of the United States
1906 establishments in Colorado
1893 establishments in Colorado
Construction and civil engineering companies established in 1893
American companies established in 1893